Rubén Ramírez Hidalgo (born 6 January 1978 in Alicante, Spain) is a former professional male tennis player from Spain. His career-high ATP singles ranking is world No. 50, achieved on 2 October 2006. His favourite surface is clay, where he has won numerous ATP Challenger Tour events, and has reached the final in three events of the ATP tour, all in 2007, finishing runner-up in all three finals.

Career
Ramírez Hidalgo turned pro in 1998.

At the 2006 French Open, Ramírez Hidalgo reached the 4th round in a Grand Slam event for the first time in his career, defeating Thierry Ascione, Christophe Rochus and future finalist David Ferrer. Before the tournament, he had lost four consecutive times in the first round of a Grand Slam, a pattern he proceeded to return to for a further 9 appearances.

On 4 August 2016, after defeating Ante Pavić in the 2nd round of the Chengdu Challenger, Ramírez Hidalgo became the first player ever to win 400 matches in the ATP Challenger Tour tournaments.

ATP career finals

Doubles: 3 (3 runner-ups)

ATP Challenger Tour

Singles finals (11–13)

Doubles titles (21)

Performance timelines

Singles

Doubles

Top 10 wins

References

External links

 
 
 Highlights of Hidalgo's match against Federer at the 2008 Monte Carlo Masters

1978 births
Living people
Sportspeople from Alicante
Spanish male tennis players
Tennis players from the Valencian Community